Pakho Chau is a Cantopop singer-songwriter in Hong Kong. In 2007, he debuted with his first EP, Beginning. Here are the awards and nominations received by Pakho Chau.

Film and television Awards

Asian Film Awards

StarHub TVB Awards Awards

TVB Star Awards Malaysia

TVB Anniversary Awards

Music Awards

MTV European Music Awards

Commercial Radio Hong Kong Ultimate Song Chart Awards
The Ultimate Song Chart Awards Presentation (叱咤樂壇流行榜頒獎典禮) is a cantopop award ceremony hosted by Commercial Radio Hong Kong known as Ultimate 903 (FM 90.3).  Unlike other cantopop award ceremonies, this one is judged based on the popularity of the song/artist on the actual radio show.

RTHK Top 10 Gold Songs Awards
The RTHK Top 10 Gold Songs Awards Ceremony(:zh:十大中文金曲頒獎音樂會) is held annually in Hong Kong since 1978.  The awards are determined by Radio and Television Hong Kong based on the work of all Asian artists (mostly cantopop) for the previous year.

Metro Showbiz Hit Awards

The Metro Showbiz Hit Awards (zh:新城勁爆頒獎禮) is held in Hong Kong annually by Metro Showbiz radio station.  It focus mostly in cantopop music.

Metro Radio Mandarin Music Awards
It was first awarded in 2002 and ended in 2015.

Jade Solid Gold Best 10 Awards Presentation

Jade Solid Gold Songs Selections

Yahoo! Asia Buzz Awards
Yahoo! Asia Buzz Awards was first held by Yahoo! Hong Kong in 2003. It was a ceremony which present awards to the artists who were popular in the end of the year.

QQ Music Awards

Sina Music Awards
This award ceremony is the first Hong Kong fan-voted ceremony held by SINA and Hong Kong SINA in 2006, and it ended in 2013.

RoadShow Music Awards
This award ceremony is organized by Hong Kong outdoor media provider RoadShow. Since 2006, it has been held in January of each year. It has been suspended since 2009.

"King of Music" Global Chinese Music Awards

Children's Song Awards Presentation
This award ceremony was first founded in 1992 by TVB, it was the first ceremony for children's songs. It has been suspended since 2009.

TVB8 Mandarin Music On Demand Awards Presentation
This award ceremony has suspended since 2016.

Global Chinese Pop Chart

AEG Music Channel Top 10 Concert Awards Presentation

References

Chau, Pakho